"End of Night" is a song by English recording artist Dido. The song was released on 5 May 2013 as the second single from her fourth studio album Girl Who Got Away (2013). The song was written by Dido and Greg Kurstin.

Music video

A lyric video for the song was uploaded to YouTube on 26 March 2013 at a total length of four minutes. On 9 April 2013 Dido tweeted that she was filming the music video for "End of Night". A music video to accompany the release of "End of Night" was first released onto YouTube on 28 April 2013 at a total length of three minutes and twenty-nine seconds.

Synopsis
The video starts with a shot of the mansion and then shows Dido sitting on a bed singing with an image of the man who represents the monster she has been able to rid herself of by ending the terror of the night. He appears normal but his monstrous face is revealed on one side when he turns. Just as she discovered his ugly side so she was trapped in the night of this darkened mansion. The video continues with others who are trapped in relationships where couples' dancing shows the torture they inflict on each other. She then leaves the mansion looking for an end to the night and for the light.

Live performances
In April 2013 Dido performed "End of Night" for the first time live on German late-night television comedy talk show TV Total. On 23 April 2013, she performed the song live on the German television programme Morgenmagazin (de). On 30 April 2013, she performed the song live on British music television show Later... with Jools Holland.

Track listing

Credits and personnel
 Written by Dido Armstrong and Greg Kurstin
 Produced by Greg Kurstin
 Mixed by Greg Kurstin
 Engineered by Greg Kurstin
 Additional engineering by Jessie Shatkin
 Recorded at Echo Studios, Los Angeles
 Vocals by Dido
 Keyboards and programming by Greg Kurstin
 Mastered by Tom Coyne at Sterling Sound

Credits adapted from Girl Who Got Away album liner notes.

Charts

Release history

References

2013 singles
Dido (singer) songs
Songs written by Dido (singer)
Song recordings produced by Greg Kurstin
Songs written by Greg Kurstin
2013 songs
Eurodisco songs
British synth-pop songs